Craig Cove Airport is an airport in Craig Cove on Ambrym Island in Vanuatu .

Airlines and destinations

References

Airports in Vanuatu
Malampa Province